John Coleman (birth unknown) is an Irish professional rugby league footballer for the Sheffield Eagles in the Co-operative Championship. He is an Ireland international.

Background
John Coleman was born in Ireland.

References

External links
Statistics at rugbyleagueproject.org
(archived by web.archive.org) Sheffield Eagles profile

Living people

Expatriate rugby league players in England
Ireland national rugby league team players
Irish expatriate rugby league players
Irish expatriate sportspeople in England
Irish rugby league players
Place of birth missing (living people)
Rugby articles needing expert attention
Sheffield Eagles players
Year of birth missing (living people)
Rugby league wingers